The Challenger Plateau is a large submarine plateau west of New Zealand and south of the Lord Howe Rise. The plateau originated in the Gondwanan breakup and is one of the five major submerged parts of Zealandia, a largely submerged continent.

References

Geography of the New Zealand seabed
Plateaus of the Pacific Ocean
Zealandia